The Watersong series by bestselling young adult fantasy paranormal author Amanda Hocking consists of four books: Wake, Lullaby, Tidal, and Elegy. Hocking, who previously enjoyed success as a self-published author, signed a book deal with St. Martin’s Press worth $2 million.

Watersong books
Wake (August 7, 2012)
Lullaby (November 27, 2012)
Tidal (June 4, 2013)
Elegy (August 6, 2013)

Other

Forgotten Lyrics (Short story) October 10, 2012)

References

American fantasy novel series